Milano Lambrate railway station is one of the main stations serving the city and comune of Milan, Italy.

Opened in 1931, the station is the third largest in Milan in terms of number of tracks, after Milano Centrale and Milano Porta Garibaldi. It is part of the Milan belt railway as well as of the railways linking Milan with Genoa, Venice, Bologna and Mantua.

The station is managed by Rete Ferroviaria Italiana (RFI), while the commercial area of the passenger building is managed by Centostazioni. The train services are operated by Trenitalia and Trenord.

Underneath the station, and connected with it, is a Milan Metro station of the same name on Line 2.

Location
Milano Lambrate railway station is situated at Piazza Enrico Bottini, in the northeastern Milanese district of Lambrate, which, until 1924, was a separate comune from Milan. It is within walking distance of the university/politecnico campus Città Studi.

History
The station inherited its name from an earlier station, located in the district of Ortica.  The earlier station was opened in 1896, on the original route of the Milan-Venice railway (the so-called Strada ferrata ferdinandea, named in honour of Emperor Ferdinand I of Austria).

The passenger building of the original station still stands on Via G. A. Amedeo, near the church of Saints Faustinus and Jovita and the present-day Buccari flyover.

In 1931, during the reorganization of the entire Milanese railway system, the original station was replaced by the present one, located on the Milan belt railway.

In the early 1990s, a new passenger terminal was constructed. It was designed by architect Ignazio Gardella and is located at Piazza Monte Titano. The 1931 building, renovated in 2005, now houses some commercial activities.

Train services

Furthermore, some international services also call at Lambrate, e.g.,
Night train (ÖBB Nightjet) Milan - Brescia - Verona - Padova - Villach - Klagenfurt - Vienna
Night train (ÖBB Nightjet) Milan - Brescia - Verona - Padova - Villach - Salzburg - Munich

Features
The station is equipped with 12 tracks, usually allocated as follows:

1: S9 trains from Saronno to Albairate-Vermezzo.
2: Trains terminating at Lambrate.
3: Regional trains from Porta Garibaldi / Greco Pirelli to Piacenza or Voghera.
4: S9 trains from Albairate-Vermezzo to Saronno, regional trains from Piacenza or Voghera to Porta Garibaldi / Greco Pirelli.
5: Local and medium-distance trains from Porta Garibaldi / Greco Pirelli to Treviglio (regular line).
6: Local and medium-distance trains from Treviglio (regular line) to Porta Garibaldi / Greco Pirelli.
7: Medium- and long-distance trains from Centrale to Treviglio (high-speed line).
8: Medium- and long-distance trains from Treviglio (high-speed line) to Centrale.
9: Long-distance trains (usually non stopping) from Centrale to Rogoredo.
10: Long-distance trains (usually non stopping) from Rogoredo to Centrale.
11: Regional and Interregional trains from Centrale to Rogoredo.
12: Regional and Interregional trains from Rogoredo to Centrale.

Interchange
The station offers interchange with Milan Metro Line 2, tram line 19, trolleybus line 93, several urban bus lines (NM2, N54, 39, 45, 53, 54, 75, 81, Q39, Q55, Q75), and an intercity bus line (924).

Gallery

See also

Railway stations in Milan
History of rail transport in Italy
Rail transport in Italy
Railway stations in Italy

References

External links

This article is based upon a translation of the Italian language version as at February 2011.

Lambrate
Railway stations opened in 1931
Milan S Lines stations
1931 establishments in Italy
Railway stations in Italy opened in the 20th century